The 1953-54 French Rugby Union Championship was contested by 64 clubs divided in eight pools of six teams and two pools of eight teams. The pools of six qualified 28 teams (the three best of each pool plus the four best fourths) and four teams from each of the pools of eight.

The championship was won by Grenoble , which beat Cognac in the final. This was the only championship in the history of Grenoble's club.
The 1992-93 French Rugby Union Championship was won by Castres who beat Grenoble 14-11 in the final, in a match decided by an irregular try accorded by the referee.

Context 
The 1954 Five Nations Championship was won - tied by Wales, France and Ireland.

France won the second (and last) edition of Europe Cup, beating Italy in the final.

Le Challenge Yves du Manoir was won by Lourdes, which defeated Toulon in the final.

Qualification phase 

There were eight pools of six teams each.  Teams in bold qualified for the next round.

The teams that qualified from the pools of eight were Niort, Albi, Stade Bagnérais and the TOEC.

"Last 32" 

Clubs in bold the qualified for the "last 16".

"Last 16" 

Clubs in bold qualified for the quarterfinals.

Quarterfinals 

Clubs in bold qualified for the semifinals.

Semifinals

Final

References

External links
 Compte rendu finale de 1954 lnr.fr

1954
France 1954
1953 in French sport